Stéphane Houdet defeated the four-time defending champion Shingo Kunieda in the final, 6–2, 6–4 to win the men's singles wheelchair tennis title at the 2013 US Open. It was his first US Open singles title and third major singles title overall.

The event was not held in 2012 due to a scheduling conflict with the 2012 Summer Paralympics.

Seeds

Draw

Finals

References

External links 
 Wheelchair Men's Singles Draws at the 2015 US Open Official Site

 
 

Wheelchair Men's Singles
U.S. Open, 2013 Men's Singles